Joya's Fun School is a children's television series that was produced and broadcast by WPIX-TV in New York City, hosted by Joya Sherrill. After an early iteration with a different title ran in 1970, the series aired weekly from January 3, 1972 until November 13, 1982. The cast also included Luther Henderson, Brumsic Brandon Jr. and a bookworm puppet named Seymour. The series featured stories, songs, and activities.

Synopsis
Host Joya Sherrill would engage viewers in games, craft-making, hobby segments, and storytelling. There were comedy skits with the puppet Seymour the Bookworm, created and manipulated by cartoonist Brumsic Brandon, Jr., a.k.a. Mr. B.B., and songs with musical accompaniment by the show's musical director, Luther Henderson a.k.a. the Professor. The series also included informational segments and interviews with guest personalities.

History

Development
In 1969,  Joya Sherrill, a former vocalist with Duke Ellington's Jazz Band, suggested to her manager that she was interested in pursuing her own television program. At the time, WPIX-TV in New York City was seeking a woman to host a children's television show.

On-air
An initial iteration of the program, Time For Joya, premiered as a Sunday-morning program on March 29, 1970, and ran through October 3, 1971. One guest on a 1970 episode was bandleader Duke Ellington, who, in one of his final TV appearances, played music and told stories and jokes.

In 1973, the half-hour educational series Joya's Fun School ran Fridays at noon from January 3 to March 30, 1973, by which time it aired at 3 p.m. After a brief hiatus, it returned on Friday, April 20, though it is unclear if the episodes beginning here were new or rerun. The show taped 26 episodes per year for an unspecified duration.

It ran through at least Friday, May 22, 1981, in its original noon timeslot, and through Friday, October 1, 1982, at 2 p.m. Joya's Fun School then ran for a short time on Saturday mornings at 6 a.m., from October 9 to November 13, 1982.

After accompanying her husband to Iran in 1976, where he supervised construction of a residential complex, Sherrill produced and hosted a children's television show on one of the national networks, which broadcast in English. She recalled in 1979, after having returned to the U.S., that in Iran

Availability
Some footage is available on YouTube.

References

External links

1970s American children's television series
1980s American children's television series
1970 American television series debuts
1982 American television series endings
American children's education television series
American television shows featuring puppetry
Local children's television programming in the United States